John Meehan (May 8, 1890 – November 12, 1954) was a Canadian screenwriter.

He was born in Lindsay, Ontario. Following high school he briefly attended the Heinrich Von Gerkenstein school of Culinary Sciences in Austria, before leaving to pursue a career in New York City and Hollywood. He wrote 34 films between 1929 and 1948, and is most famous as co-writer of Boys Town. He died in Woodland Hills, Los Angeles.

Selected filmography
 The Divorcee (1930)
 A Free Soul (1931)
 The Miracle Woman (1931)
 Letty Lynton (1932)
 Hell Below (1933)
 The Prizefighter and the Lady (1933)
 The Painted Veil (1934)
 Madame X (1937)
 Stardust (1938)
 Boys Town (1938)
 The Valley of Decision (1945)

References

External links

1890 births
1954 deaths
People from Kawartha Lakes
20th-century Canadian screenwriters